Senecio tamoides, also known as Canary creeper, false grapevine, and parlor ivy, is a climbing member of the genus Senecio of the family Asteraceae that is native to Southern Africa. It is used as an ornamental plant for its showy yellow, daisy-like flowers in autumn through to winter.

Description

It is a fast-growing, scrambling 
mostly evergreen 
perennial climber with semi-succulent stems and leaves
that creeps along the ground or twines several meters into the trees to reach the sunlit canopy where it can flower.

Stems and leaves

Flowers

Its inflorescence is many-headed, bright yellow, and the flowering spike grows to have a flat top. Flowers are cinnamon-scented and would appear from mid autumn to winter.

When cultivated in the gardens of the National Museums of Kenya, it has orange florets.

Fruits and reproduction
It grows easily from stem cuttings.

Similar species
In Australia, Senecio tamoides has been misapplied and is usually considered to be Senecio angulatus since the two species bear a striking resemblance, though S. tamoides (Canary creeper) has leaves that are comparatively softer, lighter greened, more ivy-like, less glossier and more toothed. Moreover, Canary creeper has petals that are slightly more elongated, about 10 mm long, compared to those of S. angulatus, which are 6–9 mm long.

Delairea (formerly Senecio mikanioides), a related vine in the Senecioneae tribe, is also similar looking, but features small ear-shaped appendages at the base of the stalks of the leaves and flowers that lack obvious petals, whereas both S. angulatus and S. tamoides have daisy-like flowers with several petals. Unlike S. angulatus, which is more of a scrambler, S. tamoides and Delairea grow like typical vines where they intertwine and attach themselves on objects as they climb.

Cultivation

It is a drought-tolerant, fast-growing garden plant that grows in full sun and in well-drained soil towards a wall or fence, and may need some regular plant food for robust growth and abundant flowering. Its long stems require support to climb, such as on a trellis or a pergola. It can also be allowed to naturally creep through other shrubs or by planting beside a tree, leaving it to ascend by itself. The plant's growing tips should receive full sunshine for the flowers to develop, though the base can tolerate full shade.

Although naturally evergreen, it may be semi-deciduous in places that have frosty winters where it would die back and recover again in spring. It can be pruned once in a while to maintain its spread in the garden. It can be grown from seed in spring, or from stem cuttings in summer.

Distribution

It is native to southern Africa where it occurs from the Eastern Cape to eastern Zimbabwe, as well as in parts of the forests in KwaZulu-Natal and areas along the escarpment.

The plant has been introduced to Southeast Brazil, Colombia, Eritrea, Ethiopia, Guatemala, Mauritius, Queensland and Réunion.

Invasiveness
In Australia, it is sparingly found in moist gullies in Sydney, the North Coast and South Coast of New South Wales, and southeast Queensland, after escaping from the garden as an ornamental plant due to its seeds being dispersed by wind and parts of its stems being spread in disposed garden waste. 

It is a species of concern in south-eastern Queensland, where it was ranked in a list that contains 100 most invasive species in the region. As such, the plant is listed on a few local weed lists in south-eastern QLD – It is a pest plant in Redland Shire, an invasive plant in Gold Coast City, an unwelcome species in Burnett Shire, a significant non-declared pest plant in Maroochy Shire, and an unwanted species in Caboolture Shire. However, these reports may have incorrectly applied the S. tamoides name to Senecio angulatus, since the two are often confused with each other. Further, Atlas of Living Australia has misapplied S. tamoides for its D. odorata observations in Australia.

Gallery

See also
Delairea odorata, a similar looking plant in the same tribe
Senecio angulatus, a similar looking plant generally undistinguished and synonymised with this one

References

tamoides
Creepers of South Africa
Vines
Garden plants of Africa
Ornamental plants
Plants described in 1838